B.A.L.L. (pronounced "ball") were an American alternative rock band from New York City, formed in 1987. The band was formed by Don Fleming, Kramer, David Licht and Jay Spiegel. After releasing 4 LP's (all Produced & Engineered by Kramer for his Shimmy-Disc label) and touring the US and Europe extensively with bands such as Sonic Youth and Teenage Fanclub, the band disintegrated in 1990, its members pursuing separate projects.

Discography 
Studio albums
Period (Another American Lie) (Shimmy Disc, 1987)
Bird (Shimmy Disc, 1988)
Trouble Doll (The Disappointing 3rd LP) (Shimmy Disc, 1989)
B.A.L.L. Four: Hardball (Shimmy Disc, 1990)

Compilations
Bird/Period (Shimmy Disc, 1989)

References

External links 
 

Alternative rock groups from New York (state)
Musical groups established in 1987
Musical groups disestablished in 1990
Musical groups from New York City
Shimmy Disc artists
1987 establishments in New York City